Mepraia is a genus in the subfamily Triatominae, endemic in Chile, and vectors of Chagas disease.

Species 
 Mepraia eratyrusiformis (Del Ponte, 1929)
Mepraia gajardoi Frías, Henry & González, 1998
Mepraia parapatrica Frías, 2010
Mepraia spinolai (Porter, 1934)

References

Reduviidae
Arthropods of Chile